Schnur (German and Jewish (Ashkenazic): metonymic occupational name for a maker of cords and rope from Middle High German snuor German Schnur) is a surname. Notable people with the surname include:
Brayden Schnur (born 1995), Canadian tennis player
Diego Hidalgo Schnur, Spanish philanthropist, intellectual and businessman
Max Schnur (born 1993), American tennis player
Meghan Schnur (born 1985) American soccer player
Sandra Schnur (1935–1994), American disability rights leader
Steve Schnur, President of Music for Electronic Arts (EA)
Wolfgang Schnur (1944–2016), East German civil rights lawyer
See also
Marie Schnür (1869–1918), German painter, illustrator and silhouette maker

References

Occupational surnames

German-language surnames
Jewish surnames